Sveti Vid (in older sources also Žilče pri svetem Vidu,  or Schülze) is a small village in the hills northeast of Begunje in the Municipality of Cerknica in the Inner Carniola region of Slovenia.

Name
Under Austria-Hungary, the settlement was officially known as Žilče pri svetem Vidu, but in the Kingdom of Yugoslavia it was known as Sveti Vid (literally, 'Saint Vitus') and the name Žilče was used for a hamlet of the settlement. The name of the settlement was changed from Sveti Vid nad Cerknico (literally, 'Saint Vitus above Cerknica') to Žilce in 1955. The name was changed on the basis of the 1948 Law on Names of Settlements and Designations of Squares, Streets, and Buildings as part of efforts by Slovenia's postwar communist government to remove religious elements from toponyms. The name was changed back to Sveti Vid in 1991.

Church

The local parish church, from which the settlement gets its name, is dedicated to Saint Vitus and belongs to the Roman Catholic Archdiocese of Ljubljana.

References

External links

Sveti Vid on Geopedia

Populated places in the Municipality of Cerknica